Stephen Beckwith (born 1623) was a founding settler of Norwalk, Connecticut. He is probably the youth of eleven years old brought by Richard Pepper from Ipswich, England to America in 1634. He was at Hartford in 1649, and moved to Norwalk prior to 1655. He sold his farm to Richard Homes in March 1663. He was still living in Norwalk as late as 1687.

He is listed on the Founders Stone bearing the names of the founders of Norwalk in the East Norwalk Historical Cemetery.

References

1623 births
Year of death missing
American planters
American Puritans
Founding settlers of Norwalk, Connecticut
English emigrants to British North America